Lekpande is a village in the Bassar Prefecture in the Kara Region  of north-western Togo.

References

External links
Satellite map at Maplandia.com

Populated places in Kara Region
Bassar Prefecture